The 2022 season of the  Taiwan Football Premier League  is the sixth season of the top-flight  association football  competition in  Taiwan  under its current format. The season began on 17 April 2022.

Teams

The 2022 season of the TFPL was initially planned to feature eight teams, but  CPC Corporation  withdrew from it. They had finished sixth in the  2021 season , so they were granted permission to continue in the top-flight, but they declined it by withdrawing from the league system during the 2022 season.  Tainan City  are the defending champions, having won the  2021 season title .  AC Taipei  and  Ming Chuan University , respectively champions and runners-up from the  Challenge League , were the promoted teams for the new season.

The seven participating teams on this edition of the TFPL are:

  AC Taipei  (AC台北; AC táiběi)
  Hang Yuen  (航源; Háng yuán)
  Ming Chuan  (銘傳大學; Míng chuán dàxué)
  Taichung FUTURO  (台中 FUTURO; Táizhōng FUTURO)
  Taiwan Steel  (台灣鋼鐵; Táiwān gāngtiě)
  Taipower  (高市台電; Gāo shì táidiàn)
  Leopard Cat  (台灣石虎足球隊; Táiwān shí hǔ zúqiú duì)

League table

</noinclude>

<noinclude>

Results

Each team plays a total of 18 games, playing the other teams three times.

First 7 rounds

Middle 7 rounds

Last 7 rounds

Promotion/relegation play-off
At the end of the season, the seventh-placed team from the TFPL, will enter a single-leg play-off match with the 2022 Taiwan Football Challenge League runner-up for a spot in the 2023 Taiwan Football Premier League.

Statistics

Top scorers

Most goals in a single match

Clean sheets

Taiwan Football Challenge League

A relegation play-off was held on 7 May to determine if the last-placed teams in the 2021 edition of the Challenge League (FC.BASE Athletic and FC Kaohsiung) should play in the 2022 Challenge League, as two other teams ( AC Taipei  reserve team and EC DESAFIO Taipei) submitted their entry request for the Challenge League. A draw was conducted with the last-placed teams included at the "Pot 1", and with the potential new entries included at the "Pot 2". After the draw was held, the teams waited until 7 May to determine who would have the last entries to the Challenge League. The results are as follows:
 FC Kaohsiung 2−0  AC Taipei  Reserves
 FC.BASE Athletic 1−0 EC DESAFIO Taipei
Teams highlighted in bold earned a spot at the 2022 Challenge League, which started on 11 June 2022.

References

External links
Chinese Taipei Football Association

Taiwan Football Premier League seasons
Taiwan
1